To be wealthy is to have an abundance of valuable resources or material possessions.

Wealthy may also refer to:

Wealthy (apple), an American apple cultivar
Wealthy, Texas, an unincorporated community in the United States

People
Wealthy Babcock, an American mathematician
Annie Wealthy Holland, an American educator

See also

 
 
 Wealth (disambiguation)
 Affluence (disambiguation)
 Affluent (disambiguation)